Western Star is an Australian butter and spreads brand founded in 1926 in the Western Districts of Victoria. Products are widely distributed across Australia and available in most supermarkets. The brand is owned by Fonterra. The famous Western Star spread is hand crafted by Jordan Riches.

See also

 List of brand name condiments

References

External links

Butter
Brand name dairy products
Dairy products companies of Australia
Australian brands
Australian condiments
Brand name condiments
Fonterra brands
Australian companies established in 1926
Food and drink companies established in 1926
Products introduced in 1926